Streptomyces thioluteus is a bacterium species from the genus of Streptomyces. Streptomyces thioluteus produces leupeptins, phenazines, phenoxazinones, dioxopiperazines, questiomycin A, aureothricin and aureothin.

Further reading

See also 
 List of Streptomyces species

References

External links
Type strain of Streptomyces thioluteus at BacDive -  the Bacterial Diversity Metadatabase

thioluteus
Bacteria described in 1991